Panorpa communis, the common scorpionfly, is a species of scorpionfly.

Distribution
This species is native to Europe (mostly) and Northern Asia.

Habitat
These scorpionflies can be usually found in hedgerows and patches of nettle.

Description
 
The common scorpionfly has a black and yellow body, with a reddish head and tail. The male has a pair of claspers at the end of its tail (for holding the female during mating), giving it a scorpion-like appearance, although it is not a stinger.

Its head, mounted with large eyes, is drawn into a prominent, downward pointing beak, which opens at the tip of its head.

In the female, the eighth abdominal segment is the shortest, almost twice shorter than the seventh; the sixth is narrowed towards the back. 
It has three pairs of thoracic legs and eight pairs of prolegs.

Biology and habits
The adult is seen between May and September. They eat dead insects (although they sometimes eat live aphids), sometimes taking them from spider webs and plant sap.

Although fully winged, the adults rarely fly very far and spend much of their time crawling on vegetation in damp, shaded places near water and along hedgerows. Panorpa communis is a univoltine species. Eggs are laid in soil annually and the larvae both scavenge and pupate there.

Gallery

References

External links
  Peter Holden, Geoffrey Abbott RSPB Handbook of Garden Wildlife
 Bloomsbury Concise Garden Wildlife Guide

Scavengers
Mecoptera
Insects of Europe
Insects described in 1758
Neuroptera of Europe
Articles containing video clips
Taxa named by Carl Linnaeus